Rong County or Rongxian is a county of Sichuan Province, China. It is under the administration of Zigong city.

Geography
The average elevation above sea level of county is 230 m.

Population
As of 2008, the county had a population of 700,000.

Climate

History

See also
Rongxian Giant Buddha

References

External links
  Rongxian County Government website

County-level divisions of Sichuan
Zigong